"Love handles" (also called "Quarkies") is an informal term for the sides of deposits of excess fat at the side of one's waistline, and may also refer to:
 Love Handles (game show), a Canadian television game show
 Love Händel, a fictional band in Phineas and Ferb